The following is the discography of Annihilator, a Canadian thrash metal band founded in 1984 by guitarist, bassist, vocalist, songwriter and producer Jeff Waters, and former vocalist John Bates. They are the highest-selling heavy metal group from Canada, having sold more than three million albums worldwide, although most of their sales have been generated outside of the band's home country.

Since its inception, Annihilator has released seventeen studio albums and has undergone many line-up changes. Waters is the only remaining original member left in the band, and usually assembles touring musicians to perform with him. Annihilator's first two studio albums—Alice in Hell (1989) and Never, Neverland (1990)—are considered to be influential Canadian heavy metal records. Many of their later albums also received high praise from critics, and enjoyed some success in Europe and Japan. Their latest studio album, Ballistic, Sadistic, was released in 2020.

Albums

Studio albums

Live albums

Compilation albums

Extended plays

Singles

Videos

Video albums

Music videos

References

Discographies of Canadian artists